Gravett is a surname. Notable people with the surname include:

Christopher Gravett, British historian
Emily Gravett, English children's author and illustrator
Hassani Gravett, American basketball player
Mark Gravett (1865–1938), English cricketer
Paul Gravett, London-based journalist, curator, writer and broadcaster
Robb Gravett (born 1956), British racing driver and team owner

See also
Garravet
Gravit
Grivet
Kravet